Leadgate railway station served the village of Leadgate, County Durham, England, from 1896 to 1964 on the Stanhope and Tyne Railway.

History 
The station opened on 17 August 1896 by the North Eastern Railway. The signal box was at the east of the southbound platform. This controlled access to the goods yard, which had three sidings: two of which ran behind the northbound platform and the other ran up to the northbound platform. There were more sidings to the south which served Iveston Colliery and Crookhall Iron Foundry. Like the other stations on the line, the bus service introduced in the 1920s drastically decreased the passenger numbers at the station. It closed to passengers on 23 May 1955 and to goods traffic on 10 August 1964. The site is now occupied by St Ives Gardens.

References

External links 

Disused railway stations in County Durham
Former North Eastern Railway (UK) stations
Railway stations opened in 1896
Railway stations closed in 1955
1896 establishments in England
1964 disestablishments in England
Railway stations in Great Britain opened in the 19th century